When Britain first, at Heaven's command
Arose from out the azure main;
This was the charter of the land,
And guardian angels sang this strain:

"Rule, Britannia!  rule the waves:
"Britons never will be slaves."
—first stanza of James Thomson's "Rule, Britannia", written for the masque Alfred

Nationality words link to articles with information on the nation's poetry or literature (for instance, Irish or France).

Events

Works published

Great Britain
 Sarah Dixon, Poems on Several Occasions, Canterbury: J. Abree
 John Dyer, The Ruins of Rome
 Richard Glover, An Apology for the Life of Mr. Colley Cibber
 Christopher Pitt, The Aeneid of Virgil (Books 1-4 first published 1736; see also An Essay on Vergil's Aeneid 1728, Works of Virgil 1753)
 Aquila Rose, Poems on Several Occasions, English Colonial America (posthumous)
 James Thomson, Alfred, including "Ode in Honour of Great Britain," that is, "Rule Britannia"
 Francis Tolson, Hermathenæ, Or Moral Emblems, and Ethnick Tales, with Explanatory Notes

Other
 Johann Jakob Bodmer, Von dem Wunderbaren in der Poesie a German-language critical treatise published in Switzerland

Births
Death years link to the corresponding "[year] in poetry" article:
 February 4 – Carl Michael Bellman (died 1795), Swedish poet
 April 10 – Basílio da Gama (died 1795), Brazilian
 August 15 – Matthias Claudius (died 1815), German
 September 2 – Johann Georg Jacobi (died 1814), German
 November 4 – Augustus Montagu Toplady (died 1778), English  clergyman and hymn-writer; an opponent of John Wesley; author of the hymn "Rock of Ages"
 Also:
 Charlotte Brooke (died 1793), Irish poet
 Samuel Henley (died 1815) English clergyman, school teacher,  college principal, antiquarian, writer and poet
 Thomas Moss (died 1808), English clergyman and poet
 Christoph Friedrich Sangerhausen (died 1802), German

Deaths
Death years link to the corresponding "[year] in poetry" article:
 April 23 – Thomas Tickell (born 1685), English poet and man of letters
 December 11 – Sidonia Hedwig Zäunemann (born 1711), German
 date not known – John Adams (born 1704), English Colonial American clergyman and poet
 date not known – Jane Brereton (born 1685), English poet notable as a correspondent to The Gentleman's Magazine
 date not known – Upendra Bhanja (born either 1670 or 1688), poet of Oriya Literature and awarded the title "Kavi-Samrata" - "The Emperor of the Poets"
 date not known – Amalia Wilhelmina Königsmarck  (born 1663), Swedish poet

See also

 Poetry
 List of years in poetry
 List of years in literature
 18th century in poetry
 18th century in literature
 Augustan poetry
 Scriblerus Club

Notes

18th-century poetry
Poetry